Valley is a Canadian indie pop band based in Toronto.

The band members are lead vocalist Rob Laska, guitarist Michael "Mickey" Brandolino, bassist Alex Dimauro, and drummer Karah James. They received a Juno Award nomination for Breakthrough Group of the Year at the 2020 Juno Awards as well as a nomination for Group of the Year at the Juno Awards of 2022.

History 
The band formed in 2014 after the members of two other bands accidentally got double-booked for the same time slot at a local recording studio. They released their debut EP, Car Test, in 2015, and followed up with This Room Is White in 2016. In 2018 they released Maybe Side A, the first of two EPs featuring tracks planned for their full-length debut album; the second EP, Maybe Side B, followed in spring 2019, and the full album Maybe was released in September.

Valley released their single "nevermind" in July 2020, which was then followed by "hiccup" in September. On October 15, Valley announced the release of their new EP, sucks to see you doing better which featured both "nevermind" and "hiccup", as well as four new tracks, including an acoustic version of "hiccup".

In February 2021, Valley released their single "Like 1999" and announced they would tour with Coin in over 30+ cities across North America, beginning in October.

Midway through 2021, they released a new single, "SOCIETY" (styled in all caps), which the band says came from their previous experiences of balancing an accessible narrative with their artistic pursuits. On July 23, 2021, they released a new single, "Tempo".

The single "Homebody" was a nominee for the 2021 SOCAN Songwriting Prize. "Oh sh*t... are we in love?" was released on September 1, 2021.

Discography

Albums

Extended plays

Awards and nominations

Juno Awards
The Juno Awards, more popularly known as the JUNOS, are awards presented annually to Canadian musical artists and bands to acknowledge their artistic and technical achievements in all aspects of music.

|-
| 2020
| Themselves
| Breakthrough Group of the Year
| 
|-

SOCAN Songwriting Prize
The SOCAN Songwriting Prize, formerly known as the ECHO Songwriting Prize, is an annual competition recognizing the best in Canadian emerging music, both anglophone and francophone.

|-
| 2021
| "homebody"
| Song of the Year
| 
|-

References

External links

Canadian indie pop groups
Musical groups established in 2014
Musical groups from Toronto
2014 establishments in Ontario